The 1953 Nevada Wolf Pack football team represented the University of Nevada during the 1953 college football season. Nevada competed as an independent. The Wolf Pack were led by second-year head coach Jake Lawlor and played their home games at Mackay Stadium.

Schedule

References

Nevada
Nevada Wolf Pack football seasons
Nevada Wolf Pack football